Robert Cuellar (born August 20, 1952) is an American former professional baseball player who played briefly with the Texas Rangers of the Major League Baseball (MLB) in  as a relief pitcher. He is a graduate from the University of Texas and is of Mexican American descent. He has held several coaching positions in baseball, including pitching coach, bullpen coach, and manager. He is currently a special assistant in the player development department of the Los Angeles Dodgers

Playing career
He was selected by the Texas Rangers in the 29th round (592nd overall) of the 1974 MLB draft. Bobby Cuellar played in the minor leagues from 1974 to 1981, finishing his career with one season in Mexico.  He briefly had a "cup of coffee" with the Texas Rangers in 1977 appearing in four games before returning to the minor leagues at Tucson.

Coaching career
Due to also pitching winter ball during his career as a pitcher and the lack of pitch counts in the 1970s, he overused and eventually wore out his shoulder. After his career was over, he went on to a career in coaching and managing.  Beginning in 1983, he worked in the Seattle Mariners' organization until 1996.  Since then, in addition to stints on the major league coaching staffs of the Montreal Expos, Texas Rangers, and Pittsburgh Pirates, Cuellar spent six years coaching in the Minnesota Twins' minor league system.  His resume includes:

1983–1985 Seattle Mariners, Minor League Coach
1986–1987 Wausau Timbers, Manager
1988–1988 San Bernardino Spirit, Pitching Coach
1989–1990 Williamsport Bills, Pitching Coach
1991–1991 Jacksonville Suns, Pitching Coach
1992–1993 Seattle Mariners, Minor League Pitching Instructor
1994–1994 Calgary Cannons, Pitching Coach
1995–1996 Seattle Mariners, Pitching Coach
1997–2000 Montreal Expos, Pitching Coach
2001–2001 Texas Rangers, Bullpen Coach
2002–2002 Edmonton Trappers, Pitching Coach
2003–2005 Rochester Red Wings, Pitching Coach
2006–2007 Pittsburgh Pirates, Bullpen Coach
2008–2008 New Britain Rock Cats, Manager
2009–2009 Rochester Red Wings, Pitching Coach
2013–2014 Minnesota Twins, bullpen coach
2015 Ogden Raptors, pitching coach
2016: Great Lakes Loons, pitching coach
2017: Ogden Raptors, pitching coach
2018-2019: Great Lakes Loons, pitching coach

References

External links

1952 births
Living people
American baseball players of Mexican descent
American expatriate baseball players in Canada
Bakersfield Mariners players
Baseball coaches from Texas
Baseball players from Texas
Calgary Cannons players
Charleston Charlies players
Gastonia Rangers players
Gulf Coast Rangers players
Lynchburg Rangers players
Major League Baseball bullpen coaches
Major League Baseball pitchers
Major League Baseball pitching coaches
Minnesota Twins coaches
Minor league baseball coaches
Minor league baseball managers
Montreal Expos coaches
People from Alice, Texas
Pittsburgh Pirates coaches
Seattle Mariners coaches
Salt Lake City Gulls players
San Antonio Brewers players
Tacoma Tigers players
Tacoma Tugs players
Texas Longhorns baseball players
Texas Rangers coaches
Texas Rangers players
Tucson Toros players